Argences is a commune in the Calvados department in the Normandy region of north-western France. It is in the urban area of Caen, 15 kilometres from the city.

The inhabitants of the commune are known as Argençais or Argençaises

The commune has been awarded one flower by the National Council of Towns and Villages in Bloom in the Competition of cities and villages in Bloom.

Geography
Argences is some 15 km south-east of Caen and 1 km north of Moult. Access to the commune is by the D37 road from Saint-Pair in the north passing through the commune and the town and continuing to Moult in the south. The D41 road goes east from the town to join the D613 to Caen at Vimont. The D80 road also goes north-east from the town to Saint-Pierre-du-Jonquet. Apart from the town there are also the hamlets of Le Fresne to the north, Le Mesnil in the north-east, and Le Croix de Moult south of the town. The commune consists of a large residential area in the town with a large forest in the north-east (the Bois de Saint-Gilles) with small scattered forests but mostly farmland.

The Muane river flows through the town and the commune from south to north.

History 
In 989, Richard I of Normandy donated land to the Abbey of Fécamp for the curates of Mondeville and Argences. From that date, the domain of Mondeville was managed as an ecclesiastical fief by the Barony of Argences. During the ducal era the wines of Argences were highly regarded.

In 1912, the large tile factory at Fresne built a railway line 4 km long connecting Argences to Moult-Argences Station in Moult on the Paris-Cherbourg line. The line from Argences was closed in 1931 and the nearest station is now Moult-Argences (TER Basse-Normandie).

On 16 April 1942, a group of resistance fighters derailed a Maastricht-Cherbourg train two kilometres from Moult-Argences station in Airan commune causing 28 dead and 19 wounded - all German soldiers. On 30 April of that year, in revenge for German retaliation, a new derailment of the same train killed 10 German soldiers and wounded 22 others.

Heraldry

Administration
List of Mayors

Mayors from 1929

Population

Economy
The newspaper L'Echo de la Muance was published in Argences from 1896 to 1897.

Sites and monuments
The Chateau of Fresne (1651) is registered as an historical monument.
The Church of Saint-Jean was destroyed by bombing in 1944 and only the wall of the apse remains.
The Moulin de la Porte (Mill of the door) where the wheel is powered by the Muance.
The Lavoir (Public laundry) in the Rue de la Morte eau.
The old Tuileries de Beauvais tile factory.

Argences picture gallery

Activities and events
The association of rural families organizes dance classes for children and adults (beginners, modern dance, Fit'n dance).

Notable people linked to the commune
Dominique Lemesle (1951-2007): Assistant Football Referee - 1st French Division (1979-1982)
François Fayt (1946-): composer.
Yohann Eudeline (1982-), French footballer who played at the local football club until 2000.

See also
Communes of the Calvados department

References

External links
 Argences on the Community of Communes website 
Argences on the 1750 Cassini Map

Communes of Calvados (department)